Lom or LOM may refer to:

Ethnic group
 Lom people, a Romani group, mainly in the Caucasus

Places

Antarctica
 Lom Peak

Bulgaria
Lom Municipality, a municipality
Lom, Bulgaria, a town in the municipality
Gorni Lom, a village
Lom (river), a river
Rusenski Lom, a river

Cambodia
Lom, a village in Pak Nhai

Czech Republic
Lom (Most District), a town in the Ústí nad Labem Region
Lom (Strakonice District), a municipality and village in the South Bohemian Region
Lom (Tábor District), a municipality and village in the South Bohemian Region
Lom, a village and part of Kly (Mělník District) in the Central Bohemian Region
Lom u Tachova, a municipality and village in the Plzeň Region
Mokrý Lom, a municipality and village in the South Bohemian Region

Norway
Lom, Norway, a municipality
Lom prisoner of war camp in the municipality

Slovakia
Lom nad Rimavicou, a municipality and village

Surname
 Herbert Lom, Czech-British film actor
 Iain Lom, Scottish Gaelic poet

Other uses
 Lom (album), by Seka Aleksić
 Lom (digging bar), a long metal hand tool used as a lever or to break up soil or objects
 LOM Ediciones, a Chilean publishing house

Abbreviations
 LAN on motherboard, an integrated network interface controller in a computer
 Lights out management, the ability for a system administrator to monitor and manage servers by remote control
 Locator Outer Marker, a navigational aid used by aircraft
 Learning object metadata, defined as the attributes required to fully or adequately describe a learning object
 Laminated object manufacturing, a rapid prototyping technology developed by Helisys
 Legion of Merit, a military decoration of the United States
 Wings Field Airport (FAA LID airport code "LOM"), Philadelphia, Pennsylvania
 Francisco Primo de Verdad National Airport (IATA airport code "LOM")
 Olympique de Marseille, a French football club, sometimes referred to as l'OM

See also